Sir Ronald Hugh Campbell  (27 September 1883 – 15 November 1953) was a British diplomat who held several important positions including that of British ambassador to France from July 1939 to 22 June 1940, when the armistice between Germany and France was signed at Compiègne.

He was appointed British ambassador in Paris from the post of British envoy to Yugoslavia, a considerable jump in promotion that was extremely rare in the diplomatic service. Such an important position is normally reserved for diplomats who have passed through several legations and other embassies. However, it was long recognized that Campbell possessed outstanding abilities. In November of the same year he was transferred to Lisbon to act as British ambassador. He retired from the Foreign Office at the end of his period of service as British ambassador to Portugal in July 1945.

Further reading

Sources 

1883 births
1953 deaths
Ambassadors of the United Kingdom to Yugoslavia
Ambassadors of the United Kingdom to France
Ambassadors of the United Kingdom to Portugal
Knights Grand Cross of the Order of St Michael and St George
Members of the Privy Council of the United Kingdom